Duke of Edinburgh is a title in the British peerage.

Duke of Edinburgh may also refer to:

Title holders 
Alfred, Duke of Saxe-Coburg and Gotha, who held the title from 1866 to 1900
Charles III, who held the title from 2021 to 2022
Frederick, Prince of Wales, who held the title from 1726 to 1751
George III, who held the title from 1751 to 1760
Prince Edward, Duke of Edinburgh, holder of the title since 2023
Prince Philip, Duke of Edinburgh, who held the title from 1947 to 2021
Prince William Frederick, Duke of Gloucester and Edinburgh, who held a strictly distinct Gloucester and Edinburgh title from 1805 to 1834
Prince William Henry, Duke of Gloucester and Edinburgh, who held  a strictly distinct Gloucester and Edinburgh title from 1764 to 1805

Other uses 

 7th Duke of Edinburgh's Own Gurkha Rifles, a military unit named after Prince Philip
 99th Duke of Edinburgh's (Lanarkshire) Regiment of Foot, a military unit named after Alfred
 Duke of Edinburgh Dry Dock, part of Swansea Docks and named for Alfred
 Duke of Edinburgh Stakes, a flat Handicap horse race named in 1999 after Prince Philip
 Duke of Edinburgh-class cruiser, a class of British armoured cruisers named after Alfred
 , lead ship of the class
 Duke of Edinburgh's (Wiltshire Regiment), a military unit named after Alfred
 Duke of Edinburgh's Own Edinburgh Artillery, a military unit named after Alfred
 Duke of Edinburgh's Royal Regiment, a military unit named after Prince Philip
 Gerzog Edinburgski, a Russian ship named after Alfred
 The Duke of Edinburgh Hotel, a hotel in Barrow-in-Furness, named for Alfred
 The Duke of Edinburgh, Brixton, a public house in London, named for Alfred
 The Duke of Edinburgh's Award, a youth awards programme founded by Prince Philip
 The Duke of Edinburgh's International Award - Canada, the Canadian version of the youth awards programme

See also
 Duke of Gloucester and Edinburgh